El Banna v. Bush, No. 1:04-cv-01144, is a writ of habeas corpus that was submitted on behalf of the Guantanamo captives Jamil al-Banna, Bisher Al Rawi and Martin Mubanga. They were United Kingdom citizens or residents.

George Brent Mickum was the lead counsel in this petition.

{| class="wikitable" border="1"
|+ Cases amalgamated with El Banna v. Bush
|-
! ISN || Name || Notes
|-
| 905 || Jamil El-Banna ||
 Lead petitioner in the case.
 Not "captured on the battlefield". Apprehended in Gambia, while on a business trip with his friend Bisher Al-Rawi.
 Was first held and interrogated in a CIA safe house in Gambia — not in the detention of the Gambian justice system.
 Returned to Britain in 2007.
|-
| 906 || Bisher Al-Rawi ||
 Not "captured on the battlefield". Apprehended in Gambia, while on a business trip with his friend Jamil el-Banna.
 Was first held and interrogated in a CIA safe house in Gambia — not in the detention of the Gambian justice system.
 Original arrest was nominally due to carrying a battery charger in his luggage.
 Pressure for the United Kingdom to insist on his return mounted when it became public that he was an MI-5 informant who was betrayed by his MI-5 handlers.
|-
| 10007 || Martin Mubanga ||
 A joint citizen of Zambia and the United Kingdom.
 Captured in Zambia, not "captured on the battlefield".
|}

Eligible to seek relief
On 3 July 2008, US District Court Judge Thomas F. Hogan listed this habeas petition on a list where former captives were eligible to seek relief.

References

United States District Court for the District of Columbia cases
United States habeas corpus case law
Guantanamo captives' habeas corpus petitions